Graham Bleathman  is a Bristol-based artist who draws and authors cutaways for several Haynes Manuals, including but not limited to one about Thunderbirds and one about Wallace and Gromit. He has also produced drawings for calendars, board games, lunchboxes, trading cards, jigsaw puzzles, video sleeves, and greetings cards.

References

Living people
Artists from Bristol
1959 births